Soft technology may refer to:

Soft energy technology
Soft Technology, the original title of ReNew magazine
Software